Andrey Pleshkov (born 12 March 1982) is a Belarusian rower. He competed in the men's quadruple sculls event at the 2004 Summer Olympics.

References

External links
 

1982 births
Living people
Belarusian male rowers
Olympic rowers of Belarus
Rowers at the 2004 Summer Olympics
People from Polotsk
Sportspeople from Vitebsk Region